Sidney D. Elliott (14 January 1908 – September 1986) was an English professional footballer who played as a forward.

Career
Born in Sunderland, Elliott played for High Street Wesleyans, Arcade Mission, Margate, Durham City, Fulham, Chelsea, Bristol City, Notts County, Bradford City, Rochdale and FG Minter Sports.

For Fulham he scored 26 goals in 42 league games, and also made one FA Cup appearance. For Chelsea he scored 9 goals in 30 league appearances. For Bradford City he made 15 appearances in the Football League, scoring 7 goals.

Sources

References

1908 births
1986 deaths
English footballers
Margate F.C. players
Durham City A.F.C. players
Fulham F.C. players
Chelsea F.C. players
Bristol City F.C. players
Notts County F.C. players
Bradford City A.F.C. players
Rochdale A.F.C. players
English Football League players
Association football forwards